The Celtics–Knicks rivalry is a National Basketball Association (NBA) rivalry between the Boston Celtics and the New York Knicks. The Celtics and Knicks are two of only three remaining charter franchises (the other being the Golden State Warriors) from the Basketball Association of America, which began operations in 1946.

The Celtics and Knicks were both established in 1946 as charter franchises of the Basketball Association of America, and are the two oldest teams still playing in their original city today.

History

1950s
The first playoff meeting was in the Division Semifinals of the 1950–51 season. This was the first round of the playoffs and a best-of-three series. The Knicks swept the Celtics and got to the NBA Finals, but lost to the Rochester Royals. The clubs squared off in the Division Semifinals once again in the following season. This time, the Celtics were able to win Game 1 at home, before the Knicks tied the series at home at 1. Game 3 was a tough, double overtime showdown in Boston, but the Knicks won 88–87. Once again, Knicks went to the finals and lost to the Lakers. In the 1952–53 season, the teams met in the Division Finals, a best-of-five series. The Knicks won Game 1, the Celtics won Game 2, each at home. The Knicks won Games 3 and 4 to win the series but lost to the Lakers in the Finals once again. Despite 3 Conference Championships from the help of future Hall of Famers Dick McGuire and Harry Gallatin, the Knicks never won an NBA title in the 1950s. For the 1953–54 season, the teams played in a round-robin format along with the Syracuse Nationals. This meant the 3 teams each played each other twice, and the one with the lowest winning % is eliminated. Syracuse went 4–0, Boston went 2–2, and New York went 0–4. Syracuse eliminated Boston in the following round. In the 1954–55 season, teams played each other in the Division Semifinals. The Celtics won Game 1 in Boston, the Knicks won Game 2 in New York, and the Celtics wrapped it up with a win in Game 3 but lost to the Nationals in the next round. It was the last playoff meeting until 1967. For the rest of the decade, the Knicks never advanced past the first round, while Boston won titles in the 1956–57, 1958–59, and 1959–60 seasons.

1960s
The Celtics major success continued into the 1960s as they were champions every season from 1959 to 1966. They were led by Bob Cousy, Sam Jones, Frank Ramsey, Bill Russell, Satch Sanders, Tom Heinsohn, and K.C. Jones who all either had their number retired, or were inducted to the Hall of Fame. The Knicks' struggles continued by not qualifying for the playoffs from 1960 to 1966. When the Knicks finally made it back to the playoffs in the 1966–67 season, they met the Celtics in the Division Semifinals. The Celtics won the first two, but the Knicks fought back to win Game 3. The Celtics ended the series with a win in New York, but did not win an NBA title that season as they were defeated by the Philadelphia 76ers in the next round. Boston won another title in 1968. In the 1968–69 season, the teams squared off in the Division Finals. Boston won the first two, but the Knicks won Game 3. Boston won Game 4 by one, then the Knicks won Game 5, but the Celtics won the series with another 1 point win en route to winning another NBA title.

1970s
In the 1971–72 season, the two teams met in the Conference Finals. The Knicks won the first two games, the Celtics won game 3, but the Knicks eliminated them with wins in Games 4 and 5. The Knicks went to the finals again but lost to the Lakers. In the 1972–73 season, the Knicks picked up Earl Monroe, who helped them go on another championship run. They beat Earl's old team, the Baltimore Bullets in round one, and met the Celtics in the Eastern Conference Finals. Boston won Game 1 at home, but the Knicks won the next three (Game 4 in 2OT). Boston fought back to tie the series at 3, but the Knicks routed them in Game 7 and went on to win their second NBA title. The teams met in the Conference Finals for the 3rd year in a row in the 1973–74 season. Boston won the series 4–1 and would go on to win their 12th NBA title. The Knicks era of greatness ended with the retirements of Reed and Frazier, and they went back to their old, familiar struggles. In the 1975–76 season, Dave Cowens, Jo Jo White, and the Celtics won another title.

1980s
The Knicks had minimal playoff success in the early to mid 1980s, despite Bernard King's great seasons in that time. In contrast, Larry Bird led Boston to titles in the 1980–81, 1983–84, and 1985–86 seasons. In 1984, they met in the Eastern Conference Semifinals. It was a hotly contested series that ended with a Boston win at home in Game 7 (the home team won every game) en route to the Celtics' title victory over the Lakers. In the 1987–88 season, they met in the first round of the playoffs. Boston won the first two at home, but the Knicks won Game 3, but Boston won Game 4 and the series. They made it to the Conference Finals but got eliminated by the Detroit Pistons.

1990s
The Celtics and Knicks met again in the first round of the 1990 NBA playoffs, which the Knicks won 3–2. The two teams would not meet in the playoffs again until 2011. The 1991–92 season was the last season that the Celtics would reach the second round in the 1990s, while the Knicks made it to the second round or farther every year from 1992 to 2000. Under the leadership of Patrick Ewing and Anthony Mason, the Knicks experienced plenty of success including Eastern Conference titles in 1994 and 1999. However, they failed to win an NBA title. During this time, the Knicks' rivals included the Michael Jordan-led Chicago Bulls, as well as the Miami Heat and Indiana Pacers, all of whom faced the Knicks in multiple memorable playoff series during this time. After the 1999–2000 season, Ewing was traded to the Seattle SuperSonics. The Knicks descended into irrelevance and did not win a playoff series again until 2013.

2000s
The Knicks had a major collapse after the end of the Ewing era as they did not win a single playoff game from 2001 to 2012. The Celtics went into a new era under the leadership of Paul Pierce, who became team captain in 2003 and brought them back to the playoffs. In 2006, they drafted Rajon Rondo and in 2007, they acquired Kevin Garnett and Ray Allen, which formed their "big three." The trio helped the Celtics win their 17th NBA title in the 2007–08 season.

2010–present
In the summer of 2010, the New York Knicks signed Amar'e Stoudemire, formerly of the Phoenix Suns, who subsequently began rebuilding the team. Stoudemire averaged over 27 PPG in the 2010–11 season to help the Knicks clinch their first winning season since 2001. On February 21, 2011, the Knicks engaged in a high-profile trade with the Denver Nuggets to acquire superstar Carmelo Anthony. Those moves helped secure the Knicks' first playoff berth since 2004, where they were immediately swept by the Celtics. However, the Celtics would lose to the Miami Heat.

The 2012–13 season saw the Knicks flourish under the leadership of Anthony and offseason acquisition Tyson Chandler. Anthony won the 2013 scoring title and helped them win the Atlantic Division for the first time since 1994. On January 7, 2013, the two teams played in New York. With nine minutes remaining in the fourth quarter, a fight broke out on the court, triggered by animosity between Anthony and Boston's Kevin Garnett. After the fight was broken up, words continued to be exchanged, and after the game Carmelo attempted to go after Garnett in the locker rooms. This led to Carmelo being suspended for one game. Carmelo served his suspension on January 10 when the Knicks faced the Pacers. A rep for the league released a statement, saying, "There are no circumstances in which it is acceptable to confront an opponent after a game." Both teams met again in the first round of the 2013 NBA playoffs. The Celtics, who had lost Rajon Rondo to a mid-season injury, led the first two games going into halftime but were held to 25 and 23 points respectively in the second half to fall to 0–2. With the series shifting to Boston, the Knicks won Game 3, but Boston avoided elimination by winning Game 4 in Boston and Game 5 in New York. Game 6, played in Boston, featured the Knicks leading by 26 in the fourth quarter. The Celtics went on a 20–0 run in less than five minutes to make it a close game, but the Knicks held on to win their first playoff series since 2000. In the next round, the Knicks were beaten by the Indiana Pacers in 6 games.

Head to head

Statistics

See also
 Yankees–Red Sox rivalry
 Giants–Patriots rivalry
 Jets–Patriots rivalry
 Bruins–Rangers rivalry

References

Boston Celtics
New York Knicks
National Basketball Association rivalries